Mai Wen Jae is a paralympic athlete from China competing mainly in category F46 triple jump events.

Mai Wen Jae competed in the 2004 Summer Paralympics where he won a silver medal in the triple jump for F46 class athletes as well as running in the Chinese T42-46 4 × 100 m relay team.

References

External links
 

Paralympic athletes of China
Athletes (track and field) at the 2004 Summer Paralympics
Paralympic silver medalists for China
Chinese male sprinters
Chinese male triple jumpers
Living people
Medalists at the 2004 Summer Paralympics
Year of birth missing (living people)
Paralympic medalists in athletics (track and field)
21st-century Chinese people